Lev may refer to:

People and fictional characters
Lev (given name)
Lev (surname)

Places
Lev, Azerbaijan, a village
Lev (crater), a tiny lunar crater

Religion
an abbreviation for Leviticus, the third book of the Hebrew Bible and the Torah
Lay eucharistic visitor, an extraordinary minister of Holy Communion approved by a church (usually Episcopalian or Lutheran) to bring Communion to the homebound
Libreria Editrice Vaticana, the Vatican Publishing House

Transportation
Light electric vehicle, an electric bicycle
Low emission vehicle, a motor vehicle that emits relatively low levels of motor vehicle emissions
Lunar Excursion Vehicle, an early name for the Apollo Lunar Module

Other
LEV (cable system), a submarine cable system linking countries in the eastern Mediterranean
Lev (political party), a now-defunct political party in Israel
Lev!, a Swedish glass artwork
Bulgarian lev, the currency of Bulgaria
HC Lev Praha, a professional ice hockey team in the Czech Republic
HC Lev Poprad, a Kontinental Hockey League based in Poprad, Slovakia, in the 2011–2012 season
Laborious Extra-Orbital Vehicle, a mecha from the video game Zone of the Enders
Local exhaust ventilation, the process of "changing" or replacing air to improve indoor air quality; see 
Longevity escape velocity, a hypothetical situation wherein the average human lifespan grows faster than time passes

See also

Le V, a hotel in Montreal, Quebec, Canada
Lew (disambiguation)
Lvov (disambiguation)
Lvovo (disambiguation)
Lvovsky (disambiguation)